

This page lists board and card games, wargames, miniatures games, and tabletop role-playing games published in 1998.  For video games, see 1998 in video gaming.

Games released or invented in 1998

Game awards given in 1998
 Spiel des Jahres: Elfenland - Alan R. Moon, Amigo Spiele
 Games: Fossil

Significant games-related events in 1998
Hasbro purchases the name "Avalon Hill", back inventory of that company, and rights to Avalon Hill titles for US$6 million.
Rio Grande Games founded.

See also
 1998 in video gaming

Games
Games by year